A Species Odyssey (French: L'Odyssée de l'espèce) is a French documentary film directed by Jacques Malaterre, first broadcast on January 7, 2003 on France 3.

Synopsis 
This documentary illustrates the birth of the first men. Species shown include Australopithecus afarensis, Orrorin, saber tooth cat, Saelanthropus Chalicotherium, Australopithecus anamensis, hyena, Homo habilis, crocodile, Homo ergaster, Homo erectus, viper, lion, Neanderthal, brown bear, and Homo sapiens.

Production 
 Title: L'Odyssée de l'espèce
 Directed by: Jacques Malaterre
 Screenplay: Jacques Dubuisson and Michel Fessler
 Actors: Sibusiso Mhlongo
 Original concept: Hervé Dresen
 Narration: Frederick Fougea
 Original music: Yvan Cassar
 Scientific director: Yves Coppens
 Production: France 3, RTBF, Transparencies Productions, 17 Juin Production, Mac Guff Ligne, Pixcom, Discovery Channel Canada, Channel 4, RAI, ZDF, TSR, Planet, France 5

External links 
 Official site on France 3
 

Documentary films about prehistoric life
Prehistoric people in popular culture
French documentary television films
2003 television films
2003 films
2003 documentary films
Science Channel original programming
2000s French films